Richard Rohoman (29 July 1910 – 11 April 1953) was a Guyanese cricketer. He played in two first-class matches for British Guiana in 1933/34 and 1934/35.

See also
 List of Guyanese representative cricketers

References

External links
 

1910 births
1953 deaths
Guyanese cricketers
Guyana cricketers